The Christmas Project is a Christmas album from John Schlitt. 4K Records released the album on November 19, 2013. Schlitt worked with 
Dan Needham, in the production of this album.

Critical reception

Awarding the album four stars at CCM Magazine, Andy Argyrakis states, "he brings that melodic rock style from both career chapters to the forefront of this festive and powerful collection that consists mostly of carols". Tony Cummings, indicating in a nine out of ten review for Cross Rhythms, writes, "One of the best Christmas albums you're likely to hear this or any year". Giving the album four stars from Jesus Freak Hideout, Bert Gangl says, "Judging from the high quality of his latest release, it would seem that, just like true love and fond memories, the much-loved singer only gets better with time." Jonathan J. Francesco, rating the album four stars by New Release Today, describes, "John Schlitt's first Christmas offering is the picture of a success."

Track listing

Personnel
 John Schlitt – lead and backing vocals 
 Jeff Roach – keyboards 
 Jason Webb – keyboards
 Blair Masters – programming (1)
 Tom Bukovac – guitar
 George Cocchini – guitar 
 Jerry McPherson – guitar
 Mark Hill – bass
 Dan Needham – drums, percussion, arrangements (1, 2, 3, 5, 7, 8, 10)
 Logan Needham – Scripture reading (3)
 John Elefante – backing vocals (4)
 Kari Needham – backing vocals (7)
 Scott Faircloff – backing vocals (9)

References

2013 Christmas albums
Christmas albums by American artists